The following is a timeline of the history of the city of Corpus Christi, Texas, USA.

Prior to 19th century

 1519 - Spaniard Alonso Alvarez de Pineda travels to bay on day of religious Feast of Corpus Christi.

19th century
 1821
 Mexico gains independence from Spain
 The Old Indian Trading Grounds become part of Mexico.
 1828
 Known as the Old Indian Trading Grounds.
 Manuel de Mier y Terán toured through Mexico's province of Texas. Terán noted that some officials favored Corpus Christi as a port, referring to the area on the bay since there was no settlement called Corpus Christi at the time.
 1829 - Traders are known to have landed on the coast on the Corpus Christi Bay. No civilization is apparent to traders.
 1836
 Texas gains independence from Mexico
 The Old Indian Trading Grounds become part of the Republic of Texas although the area was claimed by both Texas and Mexico.
 1839 - Henry Kinney sets up trading post (also known as "Kinney's Ranch").
 1840
 On January 17 the unrecognized country of the Republic of the Rio Grande claimed the area south of the Nueces River which included Kinney's Ranch.
 On November 6 the Republic of the Rio Grande collapsed.
 Possession of the area returns to the Republic of Texas while Mexico still claimed the area as its own.
 1845
 August: Kinney's Ranch becomes a major U.S. military outpost under command of Zachary Taylor.
 December 29: Kinney's Ranch becomes part of the United States of America after annexation of the Republic of Texas.
 1846
 March: U.S. military troops depart.
 Town becomes seat of newly created Nueces County.
 1847 - Town renamed "Corpus Christi" ("something more definite for a postmark on letters.")
 1852
 September 9: Corpus Christi incorporated. 
 Residents elect city council and mayor, Benjamin F. Neal, who served from 1852 to 1855. 
 1860 - Population: 175.
 1861 - Corpus Christi becomes part of the Confederate States of America.
 1862 - August: Town besieged by U.S. forces.
 1865 - Confederate States of America collapse and possession returns to the United States of America.
 1870 - Population: 2,140.
 1875 - Conflict between "local settlers and Mexicans."
 1876 - A city charter was adopted.
 1883 - Corpus Christi Caller newspaper begins publication.
 1890 - Population: 4,387.

20th century

 1910 - Population: 8,222.
 1911 - Corpus Christi Times newspaper begins publication.
 1912 - Roman Catholic Diocese of Corpus Christi established.
 1914
 County courthouse constructed.
 August 1: Rotary Club of Corpus Christi chartered, the 125th club of Rotary International. Rotary was instrumental in the early development of Corpus Christi, the Chamber of Commerce, and the Port.
 1919 - September: Hurricane occurs.
 1926
 September: Port of Corpus Christi opens.
 Intracoastal Waterway opens.
 1927 - Corpus Christi Public Library established.
 1928 - Grande Theatre built.
 1929
 League of United Latin American Citizens founded.
 Corpus Christi Caller-Times newspaper in publication.
 1930
 Oil discovered in vicinity of Corpus Christi.
 Population: 27,741.
 1935 - Del Mar College founded.
 1937 - KRIS radio begins broadcasting.
 1940
 Beach Theater in business.
 Population: 57,301.
 1941
 March 12: U.S. military Naval Air Station Corpus Christi commissioned.
 "Sea wall" built.
 1947 - University of Corpus Christi founded.
 1950
 North Padre Island Causeway opens.
 Population: 108,287.
 1951 - Osage Drive-In cinema in business.
 1956 - KRIS-TV and KZTV (television) begin broadcasting.
 1957 
Corpus Christi Museum of Science and History established.
Astor Restaurant established
 1959 - Harbor Bridge opens.
 1960 - Corpus Christi International Airport opens.
 1968
 Frances Farenthold elected to Texas House of Representatives from the 45th district.
 Padre Island National Seashore dedicated near city.
 1970
 August 3–4: Hurricane Celia occurs.
 Population: 204,525.
 1972 - Art Museum of South Texas established.
 1980 - August: Hurricane Allen occurs.
 1981 - Sunrise Mall in business.
 1983
 "Selena Quintanilla Pérez of Corpus Christi wins the Tejano Music Award."
 Solomon Porfirio Ortiz becomes U.S. representative for Texas's 27th congressional district.
 1985 - Port of Corpus Christi designated a foreign trade zone by U.S. Department of Commerce.
 1989 - Texas A&M University–Corpus Christi active.
 1990
 Texas State Aquarium opens.
 Greyhound Race Track in business.
 1991 - USS Lexington Museum established.
 1995 - March 31: Pop singer Selena shot and killed.
 1998 - City website online.
 2000 - Population: 277,454.

21st century

 2003 - Corpus Christi designated an All-American City.
 2004 - December 24: Snowstorm occurs.
 2007 - Senor Jaime's erected a 12 ft Rooster which is now a city monument.
 2010 - Only a Handful releases the Corpus Christi theme song "I'm from Corpus" 
 2010 - Population: 305,215.
 2011 - Blake Farenthold becomes U.S. representative for Texas's 27th congressional district.

See also
 History of Corpus Christi, Texas
 List of mayors of Corpus Christi, Texas
 National Register of Historic Places listings in Nueces County, Texas
 Timelines of other cities in the South Texas area of Texas: Brownsville, Laredo, McAllen, San Antonio

References

Bibliography
 
 
 Coleman McCampbell, Saga of a Frontier Seaport (Dallas: South-West, 1934)
 
 
 Coleman McCampbell, Texas Seaport: The Story of the Growth of Corpus Christi and the Coastal Bend Area (New York: Exposition, 1952)
 Corpus Christi: 100 Years (Corpus Christi Caller-Times, 1952)
 
 Dan E. Kilgore, "Corpus Christi: A Quarter Century of Development, 1900–1925," Southwestern Historical Quarterly 75 (April 1972). 
 Dan Kilgore, Nueces County, Texas, 1750–1800: A Bicentennial Memoir (Corpus Christi: Friends of the Corpus Christi Museum, 1975)
 Bill Walraven, Corpus Christi: The History of a Texas Seaport (Woodland Hills, California, 1982)
 Eugenia Reynolds Briscoe, City by the Sea: A History of Corpus Christi, Texas, 1519–1875 (New York: Vantage, 1985)

External links

 
 
 Items related to Corpus Christi, Texas, various dates (via Digital Public Library of America)

Images

Corpus Christi